Stuart Clark is a contemporary English writer and widely read astronomy journalist. His career is devoted to presenting the dynamic and complex world of astronomy to the general public, both as semi-fictional novels of past scientists and as popularised astronomy articles.

Short biography
Clark holds a first class honours degree and a PhD in astrophysics. He is a Fellow of the Royal Astronomical Society and a former Vice Chair of the Association of British Science Writers. On 9 August 2000, UK daily newspaper The Independent placed him alongside Stephen Hawking and the Astronomer Royal, Professor Sir Martin Rees, as one of the 'stars' of British astrophysics teaching.

Currently he divides his time between writing books and, in his capacity of cosmology consultant, writing articles for New Scientist. He writes for the European Space Agency where he was Senior Editor for Space Science for some time. Over the years Clark has written for amongst others: BBC Sky at Night, BBC Focus, The Times, The Guardian, The Economist, The Times Higher Education Supplement, Daily Express, Astronomy Now and Sky and Telescope.

Until 2001, Stuart was the Director of Public Astronomy Education at the University of Hertfordshire. There he taught undergraduates, postgraduates and the general public, whilst researching star formation, planetary habitability and the origins of life. In a paper published by Science in 1998, he helped develop the current paradigm that the left-handed amino acids necessary for the origin of life on Earth were synthesized in star-forming regions spread throughout the Galaxy.

In 2001, Stuart decided to increase his part-time writing to a full-time occupation. He remains a visiting fellow promoting the university and contributing to observatory open nights. Having crossed from mainstream science into science journalism, he now spends his working life translating astronomy, space research and physics into comprehensible language for the general public. Stuart has also been the accompanying astronomer on a cruise ship and on an eclipse tour to China. He frequently lectures to the public up and down the UK and, increasingly, across the world.

Selected bibliography
The Day Without Yesterday (The Sky's Dark Labyrinth Trilogy: Book III), Polygon, 2013
The Sensorium of God (The Sky's Dark Labyrinth Trilogy: Book II), Polygon, 2012
The Sky's Dark Labyrinth (The Sky's Dark Labyrinth Trilogy: Book I), Polygon, 2011
Voyager: 101 Wonders Between Earth and the Edge of the Cosmos, Atlantic, 2012
The Big Questions: The Universe, Quercus Publishing, 2010
Galaxy Exploring the Milky Way, Barnes and Noble, 2008 (UK: Quercus, 2009)
Deep Space The Universe from the beginning, Barnes and Noble, 2007 (UK: Quercus, 2008)
The Sun Kings: The Unexpected Tragedy of Richard Carrington and the Tale of How Modern Astronomy Began (shortlisted by the Royal Society for their 2008 general science book prize), Princeton University Press, 2009 
Journey to the Stars, Oxford University Press, 2000
Life on Other Worlds and How to Find It, Springer-Praxis, 2000
Universe in Focus: The Story of the Hubble Space Telescope, Andromeda, 1997 (updated 1998)

Clark has contributed to, as well as performing in, the National Geographic programme Storm Worlds. His other numerous television and radio contributions in person include Radio 4's Material World, Radio 3's The Essay, BBC's Tomorrow's World and Nine O'clock News, and Channel 4's Big Breakfast.

References

External links

Clark's broadcasts

21st-century British novelists
Living people
Year of birth missing (living people)
British male novelists
21st-century British male writers